"Spoken Word" is a song by British record production duo Chase & Status, featuring vocals from British rapper George the Poet. The song was released as a digital download on 17 June 2016 through MTA Records and Mercury Records. The song peaked at number 78 on the UK Singles Chart. The song was written by Nigel Swanston, Tim Cox, Saul Milton, William Kennard, Nathaniel Ledwidge, George Mpanga and produced by Chase & Status.

Music video
A music video to accompany the release of "Spoken Word" was first released onto YouTube on 12 July 2016 at a total length of three minutes and twenty-four seconds.

Track listing

Chart performance

Weekly charts

Release history

References

2016 singles
2016 songs
Chase & Status songs
Songs written by Saul Milton
Songs written by Will Kennard
Mercury Records singles
Songs written by Nigel Swanston